Richard Daniel Burgess (born 1 August 1974) is an English former footballer who played as a forward.

He spent the 1990s with Aston Villa and Stoke City, though did not make a first-team appearance. He had brief loan spells at Kidderminster Harriers and Worcester City in the second half of the 1999–2000 season, before joining Southern League Division One West team Bromsgrove Rovers. He returned to the English Football League with Port Vale in April 2001, but failed to make an impression and was allowed to return to the non-league scene with Nuneaton Borough in January 2002. He went back to Bromsgrove Rovers for the 2002–03 season, and later had spells with Redditch United, Halesowen Town, Stourport Swifts, Bewdley Town and Bromyard Town. He helped Redditch to win the Southern League Division One West title in 2003–04.

Career
Burgess started his career as an associated schoolboy with Aston Villa, but left for Stoke City in 1997 without having played a first-team game for the "Villans". He had a loan at nearby Kidderminster Harriers in February 2000, making three substitute appearances. On 1 April 2000, he joined Southern League Premier Division side Worcester City on loan until the end of the season as manager John Barton wanted "more options up front".

After being released by the "Potters" he joined Bromsgrove Rovers. In November 2000 he had a week-long trial at Northampton Town and was scouted by a number of other clubs. He signed for Second Division club Port Vale in April 2001. He scored his first goal in an FA Cup First Round 3–0 win over Aylesbury United on 17 November 2001. However, he made just three league appearances that season and left on a free transfer in January 2002 to sign for non-league Nuneaton Borough. He was released at the end of the 2001–02 season.

He went on to rejoin Bromsgrove Rovers; Redditch United attempted to sign Burgess in November 2002 but were turned down by Bromsgrove. He eventually did get his move to Redditch United and later represented Halesowen Town before he again returned to Bromsgrove Rovers. During his time at Redditch United
he helped the club win promotion as champions of the Southern League Division One West in 2003–04. He signed with Stourport Swifts in January 2005, and scored a brace on his debut in a 2–1 victory over Bedworth United. He joined Bromsgrove Rovers for the fourth time in his career in May 2006.

He started the 2007–08 season on loan at West Midlands League Premier Division side Bewdley Town. He joined the club permanently, staying until July 2013, when he left the club after joint-manager Craig Payton admitted he could no longer guarantee him first-team football. He spent the 2013–14 season with Bromyard Town. He won the Worcestershire Senior Urn with Bwedley in 2011 and 2012.

Career statistics
Source:

Honours
Redditch United
Southern League Division One West: 2003–04

Bewdley Town
Worcestershire Senior Urn: 2011 & 2012

References

1974 births
Living people
People from Stourport-on-Severn
Sportspeople from Worcestershire
English footballers
England youth international footballers
Association football forwards
Aston Villa F.C. players
Stoke City F.C. players
Kidderminster Harriers F.C. players
Worcester City F.C. players
Bromsgrove Rovers F.C. players
Port Vale F.C. players
Nuneaton Borough F.C. players
Redditch United F.C. players
Halesowen Town F.C. players
Stourport Swifts F.C. players
Bewdley Town F.C. players
Bromyard Town F.C. players
National League (English football) players
Southern Football League players
English Football League players